Orestes of Cappadocia was a soldier who is venerated as a martyr by the Eastern Orthodox Church, along with Eustratius, Auxentius, Eugene, and Mardarius.  Tradition states that he was martyred during the reign of Diocletian.

References

External links
The Holy Martyrs Eustratius, Auxentius, Eugene, Mardarius and Orestes

4th-century Christian martyrs
4th-century Romans
Year of birth unknown